Aleksander Mandziara, born as Alfons Mandziara, (16 August 1940 – 2 September 2015) was a Polish football player and coach.

Playing career
Aleksander Mandziara played for ŁTS Łabędy, Flota Gdynia, Szombierki Bytom, NAC Breda and GKS Tychy.

Coaching career
Mandziara managed GKS Tychy, Pogoń Szczecin, Rot-Weiss Essen, BSC Young Boys, FC Biel/Bienne, LASK Linz, FC Stahl Linz, SV Darmstadt 98 and FC Bern.

Honours
Young Boys
Swiss League: 1985–86
Swiss Cup: 1986–87
Swiss Super Cup: 1986

References

1940 births
2015 deaths
Polish emigrants to Germany
Polish footballers
Association football defenders
NAC Breda players
GKS Tychy players
German football managers
Polish football managers
GKS Tychy managers
Pogoń Szczecin managers
Rot-Weiss Essen managers
BSC Young Boys managers
FC Biel-Bienne managers
LASK managers
SV Darmstadt 98 managers
Sportspeople from Gliwice
FC Bern managers
Szombierki Bytom players
Expatriate footballers in the Netherlands
Polish expatriate sportspeople in the Netherlands
Polish expatriate football managers
German expatriate football managers
Polish expatriate sportspeople in Switzerland
German expatriate sportspeople in Switzerland
Expatriate football managers in Switzerland
Polish expatriate sportspeople in Austria
West German expatriate sportspeople in the Netherlands
Expatriate football managers in Austria
FC Linz managers
West German footballers
West German expatriate sportspeople in Switzerland
West German football managers
West German expatriate football managers